Online maps can be basically divided by the covered area (global or local) and by the representation of this area (classic drawn or orthophoto).

Global online maps
These maps cover the world, but may have insufficient details in some areas.

Apple Maps
Bing Maps
Esri
Google Earth
Google Maps
Here
Here WeGo
Jawg Maps
Mapbox (based on Openstreetmap)
MapTiler
MapQuest (based on Openstreetmap)
Moovit
OpenStreetMap
Petal Maps
Stadia Maps
TomTom
Waze
WikiMapia
Yahoo! Maps (defunct)
Yandex Maps

By continent

Africa
 Africomaps - Covers all 54 countries in the African continent
 Africa Data Hub

Europe
ViaMichelin (based on TomTom

Local online maps
Local maps cover only part of the earth surface, and may be more detailed than the global ones.

Australia
"The Australian National Map", by TerriaJS.
"MinView", by NSW Government
"Whereis", by Sensis

Azerbaijan
"GoMap.Az", by the Government of Azerbaijan.

Bangladesh
"Barikoi" - covers Bangladesh, specially Dhaka city and parts of Narayanganj in detail, more cities will be covered soon

Bahrain
"Bahrain Locator", by the Government of Bahrain.

Belgium
 Geo.Brussels - covers the Brussels Region
 Geopunt - covers the Flemish Region and offers all data as open data downloads and services 
 WalonMap - covers the Walloon Region

China
 "AutoNavi Maps", by AutoNavi (Gaode).
 "Baidu Maps", by Baidu.
 "Tencent Maps", by Tencent.
 Sogou Map by Sogou
 "Tianditu", by China's State Bureau of Surveying and Mapping.

Czech Republic
 Mapy.cz, by Seznam.cz; also covers Slovakia and uses OpenStreetMap for other countries

Denmark
 "Kraks Kort" - also covers Finland, Norway and Sweden

Egypt
"NARSS Geoportal", by the National Authority for Remote Sensing and Space Sciences.

Estonia
 Estonian Land Board - covers the whole country

European Union
"INSPIRE Geoportal", by the European Commission.

Finland
 "Kraks Kort" - also covers Denmark, Norway and Sweden

France
 Géoportail - government run public service mapping, covers the whole French territory
 ViaMichelin - World maps, city maps, driving directions, Michelin-starred restaurants, hotel booking, traffic news and weather forecast with ViaMichelin.
 Mappy.com - Maps, route planning and address guide services to plan your journeys on all roads Europe.

Germany
"Geoportal.de", by the Federal Agency for Cartography and Geodesy (BKG).

Hong Kong 
 Centamap – launched in 1999, Centamap is built using data from the Hong Kong Government
 GeoInfo Map, by the Hong Kong Special Administrative Region Government

India
 "Bhuvan", by National Remote Sensing Centre, ISRO
 "MapmyIndia Maps", by MapmyIndia
 "MapsofIndia", by Compare Infobase Limited
 "Survey of India Maps", by the Survey of India, DST

Indonesia
"Ina-Geoportal", by Badan Informasi Geospasial.

Israel
"Walla! Maps", by Walla!.
"Govmap", by Survey of Israel.
"Simplex 3D", by Simplex.

Japan
"Yahoo! Japan Maps", by Yahoo! Japan.
"MapFan", by Increment P.

Kuwait
"Kuwait Finder", by Kuwait's Public Authority for Civil Information.

Malaysia
"1Malaysia Map", by the Ministry of Water, Land and Natural Resources (Malaysia).

Malta
"Geoserver map portal", by the Planning Authority.

Montenegro
"PlanPlus", by Contrast d.o.o.

Myanmar
 "DPS Map", covers Myanmar/Burma.

New Zealand
"NZGB Gazetteer", by Land Information New Zealand.

Nigeria
 Lagos State: Lagos State Spatial Data Infrastructure

Norway
 "Norgeskart" - Map by the Norwegian Mapping and Cadastre Authority
"Geonorge" - Another map by the Norwegian Mapping and Cadastre Authority
"Kraks Kort" - Danish map that covers Denmark, Norway (Excluding Svalbard, Jan Mayen and Bouvet), Sweden and Finland

Oman
"National Survey Authority Geoportal", by Oman's National Survey Authority.

Palestine
"GeoMOLG", by the Government of Palestine.

Philippines
"Philippine Geoportal", by the National Mapping and Resource Information Authority.

Qatar
"Qatar Geoportal", by Qatar's Center for Geographic Information Systems (CGIS), part of the Ministry of Municipality and Environment.

Russia
 Yandex Maps, by Yandex.
 2GIS, by 2gis.
 Maps.me, by Mail.Ru

Saudi Arabia
"GeoPortal Saudia", by the General Commission for Survey (GCS).

Serbia
"PlanPlus", by Contrast d.o.o.

Singapore
"OneMap", by the Singapore Land Authority.

Slovenia
GeaBios

South Africa
"AfriGIS Maps", by AfriGIS.

South Korea
"Daum Map", by Daum (web portal).
"Naver Maps", by Naver.
  T Map by SK Telecom
 One Navi by KT corporation

Spain 

 Spanish official cartography website, including National Topographic Maps MTN50 (1:50,000 scale) and MTN25 (1:25,000 scale).
 SITPA-IDEAS, Asturias regional maps.

Sweden
 "Kraks Kort" - also covers Denmark, Finland and Norway
Eniro.se, also covers Denmark, Finland and Norway
Hitta.se

Switzerland
 map.geo.admin.ch - Federal Geoportal Map Viewer - covers whole country with high-resolution maps

Taiwan
"NLSC Maps", by the National Land Surveying and Mapping Center.

Thailand
"Longdo Map", by Longdo.
"NOSTRA Map", by Globetech.

Turkey
"Gezgin Geoportal", by the Scientific and Technological Research Council of Turkey.

United Arab Emirates
"Abu Dhabi Geospatial Portal", an initiative of the Abu Dhabi Spatial Data Infrastructure (AD-SDI) program by the Abu Dhabi Smart Solutions & Services Authority.
"Makani", by Dubai Municipality's Geographic Information Systems Department.

United Kingdom
 Digimap
 "OS Maps", by Ordnance Survey.
 OpenStreetMap - covers the whole country
 "StreetMap", by Streetmap EU Ltd, at streetmap.co.uk - covers the whole country

United States
 Apple Maps - covers the whole country
 Bing Maps – covers the whole country
 Google Maps - covers the whole country
 Libre Map Project
 MapQuest - covers the whole country
 The National Map by the United States Geological Survey.
 Roadtrippers - covers the whole country
 TerraServer-USA - covers the whole country

Vietnam
"Vietbando Maps", by Vietbando.
"Vinalo Maps", Vinalo.

See also 
 Comparison of web map services
 National mapping agency

References

External links 
 Collection of online maps

 Web Geographic information systems
Map
Online map services